Christopher Isaac "Biz" Stone (born March 10, 1974) is an American entrepreneur who is a co-founder of Twitter, among other technology companies. Stone was the creative director at Xanga from 1999 to 2001. Stone co-founded Jelly, with Ben Finkel. Jelly was launched in 2014 and was a search engine driven by visual imagery and discovery. Stone was Jelly’s CEO until its acquisition by Pinterest in 2017. On May 16, 2017, Biz Stone announced he was returning to Twitter Inc.

Education
Stone graduated from Wellesley High School in Wellesley, Massachusetts. He attended Northeastern University and the University of Massachusetts Boston, but did not graduate from either.

Career
Aside from Twitter, Stone is an angel investor and advisor in the startup community having backed companies in diverse industries such as Square, Slack, Medium, Nest, Beyond Meat, Pinterest, Intercom, and Faraday. Stone is a board director at Beyond Meat, Medium, Polaroid Swing, Workpop, and Jelly Industries. Stone is Chairman of Polaroid Swing.

Stone made his directorial debut working alongside Ron Howard and Canon USA to direct a short film, Evermore, as a part of Project Imaginat10n. Stone described the opportunity as a chance to scratch a long-time creative itch. Stone is also an advisor to Zoic Studios, and an Executive Producer of the documentary Eating Animals along with Natalie Portman.

From 2003 to 2005, Stone held a senior leadership role at Google.

In May 2017, Stone announced his intention to return to Twitter.

Awards and honors
Along with Jack Dorsey, Stone holds the patent for inventing Twitter.

Stone has been honored with the International Center for Journalists Innovation Award, Inc. magazine named him Entrepreneur of the Decade, Time listed him as one of the 100 Most Influential People in the World, and GQ named him Nerd of the Year, along with Evan Williams. In 2014, The Economist recognized Stone with an Innovation Award.

In 2015, Stone’s Twitter won an Emmy and Stone received CIPR's most prestigious accolade for leadership at the forefront of developing new forms of media.

Stone is a visiting fellow at Oxford University and a member of the Senior Common Room at Exeter College, Oxford. Upon delivering the 2011 commencement, Babson College awarded Stone their highest honorary degree, a Doctor of Laws. and is a Fellow at Oxford University. Stone is an Executive Fellow at University of California, Berkeley.

Published works
Stone has published three books, Blogging: Genius Strategies for Instant Web Content (New Riders, 2002), Who Let The Blogs Out? (St Martins, 2004),[19] and Things A Little Bird Told Me (Grand Central, 2014). In addition to his long running personal blog and Medium articles, Stone has published op-eds for The Atlantic and The Times.

Personal life
Stone is an active philanthropist, and is involved in causes including animal rights, veganism, environmentalism, poverty, health and education. Stone is an advisor and contributor to DonorsChoose, a nonprofit organization helping classrooms in need.

Stone lives in Marin County, California, with his wife Livia and his son Jacob. He and his wife founded and operate the Biz and Livia Stone Foundation, which supports education and conservation in California.

See also
 Jelly (app)

References

External links

 
 Biz Stone interview with The Swellesley Report, about his growing up in Wellesley, MA
 Biz Stone Q&A with Boston Globe Magazine
 Biz Stone Responds to Malcolm Gladwell's Critique of Twitter

American bloggers
American computer programmers
Businesspeople from San Francisco
Living people
Place of birth missing (living people)
1974 births
Twitter, Inc. people
Businesspeople from Massachusetts
American computer businesspeople
Wellesley High School alumni
American technology chief executives